The Ahukini Terminal and Railway was a narrow gauge railroad company in Hawaii, United States. It did not connect to the other railroad on the island, the Kauai Railway, built in the same track gauge. The railroad was opened 1920 and acquired in 1932 by local customers. The last train ran in 1959.

Further reading 
 Drury, George H. 2007 Hawaiian Railroads, in: William D. Middleton, George M. Smerk, Roberta L. Diehl (ed.): Encyclopedia of North American Railroads. Indiana University Press, Bloomington IN/Indianapolis IN. 
 Walker, Mike. 1998 Comprehensive Railroad Atlas of North America. Pacific Northwest.

See also

Heritage railroads
List of heritage railroads in the United States

References

External links

2 ft 6 in gauge railways in Hawaii
Defunct Hawaii railroads
Transportation in Kauai County, Hawaii
1920 establishments in Hawaii
1959 disestablishments in Hawaii
American companies established in 1920
American companies disestablished in 1959
Railway companies established in 1920
Railway companies disestablished in 1959